Arnoside House and Essex House are adjoining grade II* listed buildings on The Green, Southgate, London.

The walls and railings at the front of the houses are also grade II* listed, while Arnoside Cottage to the west is grade II listed.

See also
Old House & Essex Coach House

References

External links

Southgate, London
Houses in the London Borough of Enfield
Grade II* listed buildings in the London Borough of Enfield
Grade II* listed houses in London
Houses completed in the 18th century